Andy Scott (born 1964) is a Scottish figurative sculptor, working in galvanised steel.

Biography
Andy Scott graduated from Glasgow School of Art in 1986 with a Bachelor of Arts (with honours) in Fine Art Sculpture, and in 1987 with a diploma in Postgraduate Studies.

Andy Scott is a Philadelphia-based figurative sculptor who works internationally on public and private artworks.

Notable works

 The Kelpies, monumental horses heads completed on 27 November 2013 Falkirk, Scotland
 Arria, Cumbernauld, Scotland
 Poised, Marischal Square, Aberdeen
 Rise, Glasgow Harbour, Scotland
 COB, Bexley, London
 Arabesque, Queensland, Australia
 Argestes Aqua, Victoria, Australia
 River Spirit, Stride, Foxboy, I Can See For Miles, Journeys End, Lifeline: all Clackmannanshire, Scotland
 Beacon of Hope, Belfast, Northern Ireland
 Ibrox Disaster Memorial, Glasgow, Scotland
 Heavy Horse, on M8 Edinburgh to Glasgow motorway
 Equus Altüs and The Briggate Minerva, Trinity Leeds shopping centre, Leeds, England
 Charles Rennie Mackintosh, Glasgow, statue unveiled on the 90th anniversary of his death on 10 December 2018.
 The DunBear, DunBear Park in Dunbar, statue unveiled on 2019 in honour of Dunbar-born naturalist John Muir.
 Statues of Vincent Kompany, David Silva, and Sergio Agüero, Etihad Stadium, Manchester

Gallery

See also
Water-horse
Falkirk Helix
List of sculptors

References

External links

Inception Gallery website
Andy Scott Public Art website showing the history and progress of The Kelpies project
The Helix website, location of The Kelpies sculptures
Article about Andy Scott from The Scotsman newspaper
BBC NEWS, 1 July 2008: Horses inspire landmark sculpture
BBC NEWS, 14 November 2007: In Pictures — The Helix Project
BBC NEWS, 15 July 2008, Andy Scott sculptures in Clackmannanshire
Sculpture Scotland website, listing Andy Scott

Scottish sculptors
Scottish male sculptors
1964 births
Living people
Alumni of the Glasgow School of Art
Artists from Glasgow
People educated at Bellahouston Academy
Scottish expatriates in the United States